Chief Louis Orok Edet QPM (1914–1979) was the Inspector General of the Nigeria Police Force from 1964–1966. He was the first indigenous Nigerian to occupy the position. He was briefly the chairman of the Nigerian Football Association in the early 1960s. He was born in Calabar to the family of Edet Essien and Geraldine Orok. After the end of the Nigerian civil war, he devoted his time to helping war refugees and later became a commissioner for social services. He established a charity organization to continue his effort. 

The Nigeria Police Force headquarters in Abuja is named after Louis Edet as "Louis Edet House".

References 

1914 births
1979 deaths
People of Efik descent
People from Calabar